Mall Cops: Mall of America is an American reality television series that follows the work of the security team at the Mall of America in Bloomington, Minnesota, the largest mall in North America. The series was originally just a special one-hour event, however due to the popularity TLC decided to commission a twelve-part series of half an hour length. The special aired on October 15, 2009 with the series debuting on May 27, 2010. It is produced by September Films, the company behind Bridezillas.

Format
Mall Cops: Mall of America documents the events of a 100-plus team of mall security officers in the biggest mall in America. The Mall Cops help lost kids, track down shoplifters, arrest disorderly guests, and responding to a variety of medical calls.  Mall of America boasts more than 500 stores, a theme park, an aquarium and a school.

Episodes

Season 1 (2010)

Reception
Reviews of the premier of the series were mostly negative, Tom Conroy of Media Life Magazine claimed "At the end of a tired Wednesday, few viewers will be up for a half hour of blandness with a tinge of despair" and Barry Garron of the online site "Hollywood Reporter" said "Making the Mall of America safe for shoppers, one weirdo at a time, isn't as exciting as you might think."

References

2010s American reality television series
2010 American television series debuts
2010 American television series endings
English-language television shows
TLC (TV network) original programming